George Casper Adolph Maria Prosper Dankel (6 March 1864 – 31 May 1926) was one of the first members of the Australian House of Representatives who was not of Anglo-Celtic origin. He was born in Germany and, given the social tensions generated by World War I, it is understandable he chose to retire in the 1917 election. He was a member for the Division of Boothby in South Australia from 1913 until 1917. Prior to that, he was a state MP in the seat of Torrens from 1905 to 1912. He was a member of the Australian Labor Party, switching to the Nationalist Party of Australia in 1917.

Dankel left Germany for Australia at the age of 15, primarily to avoid military service. He worked in the country for several years before settling in Kensington and opening a butcher shop. He served on the district council and was a foundation member of the Australian Labor Party. He was elected as a member for Torrens in 1905, 1906 and 1910, but was defeated in 1912. In 1913, he defeated the sitting Liberal member, David Gordon, to be elected as the member for Boothby, and was re-elected in 1914.

With World War I underway, the All-British League secured 17,000 signatures on a petition calling for Dankel's resignation or dismissal from parliament. He continued to attend regularly, but rarely spoke in the chamber. With Billy Hughes and 21 others, he left the ALP to form the Nationalist Party, which was in favour of compulsory military service. Both Dankel and Jacob Stumm, the only other German-born MP, chose not to stand in the 1917 election.

References

 

1864 births
1926 deaths
Australian Labor Party members of the Parliament of Australia
Nationalist Party of Australia members of the Parliament of Australia
Members of the Australian House of Representatives
Members of the Australian House of Representatives for Boothby
National Labor Party members of the Parliament of Australia
German emigrants to Australia
20th-century Australian politicians